Amrit Kaur (born June 4, 1993) is a Canadian actress, producer, and writer, best known for her role as Bela Malhotra on the 2021 HBO Max series, The Sex Lives of College Girls.

Early life and education 
Amrit Kaur grew up in a Sikh family in Markham, Ontario. Her parents emigrated from India to Canada before she was born.

She began acting as an extracurricular in high school, serving as the senior captain of her school's improv team. She earned her BFA in theatre from the School of the Arts, Media, Performance & Design at York University in Toronto.

Career 
Amrit Kaur is best known for her breakout role of Bela Malhotra in Mindy Kaling's Sex Lives of College Girls. Amrit has acted in various American and Canadian television shows, including American Gothic, Kim's Convenience, Hudson & Rex, Nurses, and The D Cut. Kaur also played Pasha in the 2017 Canadian film Brown Girl Begins and had appeared as Jessie in the 2018 romantic comedy film Little Italy.

Kaur was cast as freshman Bela Malhotra on Mindy Kaling's television series, The Sex Lives of College Girls, which premiered on HBO Max in November 2021 and was renewed for a second season the following month. She auditioned for the role despite not having the required O-1 Visa, which allows "individuals with extraordinary ability to achievement" to work in the United States for up to three years. Because the producers discovered that she didn't have the visa, they canceled her callback but later gave her another chance. She then advanced to the final round of auditions but her O-1 Visa application was rejected. However, all of the producers on the show – including Kaling – wrote letters urging the U.S. government to accept her visa, which was later approved.

Kaur recently finished filming "Me, My Mom & Sharmila" a feature film written and directed by Fawzia Mirza, set to be released in 2023.

Filmography

Television

Film

See also
 South Asian Canadians in the Greater Toronto Area

References 

Living people
Canadian television actresses
Canadian television producers
Canadian television writers
York University alumni
Canadian women television writers
Canadian women television producers
Canadian people of Indian descent
1993 births